Parasiopsis is a monotypic moth genus of the family Erebidae. Its only species, Parasiopsis arcuata, is found in Angola. Both the genus and the species were first described by George Thomas Bethune-Baker in 1911.

References

Endemic fauna of Angola
Hypeninae
Monotypic moth genera